Larinopoda aspidos, the Nigerian pierid blue, is a butterfly in the family Lycaenidae. The species was first described by Hamilton Herbert Druce in 1890. It is found in Ghana (the Volta Region), Togo and Nigeria (south and the Cross River loop). The habitat consists of forests.

References

Butterflies described in 1890
Poritiinae
Butterflies of Africa